Carlos Israel Discua Castellanos (born 20 September 1984) is a Honduran football player who currently plays for C.D. Marathón in the Honduran Liga Nacional.

Club career
Nicknamed el Chino, Discua played for Victoria and Olimpia as well as for Guatemalan outfits Deportivo Xinabajul and Comunicaciones before joining F.C. Motagua. He scored his first goal for Motagua on 2 November 2011 in the 3–0 home victory over C.D.S. Vida.
In July, 2015, Discua joined Costa Rican first division team, Liga Deportiva Alajuelense. He debuted with La Liga on July 26, 2015, as a starter in the Super Clásico, against Deportivo Saprissa.

International career
Discua made his debut for Honduras in an April 2012 friendly match against Costa Rica and has, as of June 2015, earned a total of 13 caps, scoring one goal. He scored his first goal against the U.S. in the 2015 Gold Cup.

International goals
Scores and results list Honduras' goal tally first.

Honours and awards

Club
C.D. Olimpia
Liga Profesional de Honduras: 2007–08 C
Comunicaciones F.C.
Liga Nacional de Fútbol de Guatemala: 2010–11 C
F.C. Motagua
Liga Profesional de Honduras: 2014–15 A, 2016–17 A, 2016–17 C
Honduran Supercup: 2017
C.D. Marathón
Honduran Supercup: 2019

References

External links

1984 births
Living people
Sportspeople from Tegucigalpa
Association football midfielders
Honduran footballers
Honduras international footballers
C.D. Olimpia players
C.D. Victoria players
Comunicaciones F.C. players
F.C. Motagua players
Liga Nacional de Fútbol Profesional de Honduras players
Honduran expatriate footballers
Expatriate footballers in Guatemala
2014 Copa Centroamericana players
2015 CONCACAF Gold Cup players
2017 CONCACAF Gold Cup players